Avery Rochelle Warley-Talbert (born May 17, 1987), is an American professional basketball player. She has also played for the Chicago Sky, New York Liberty, Atlanta Dream, and San Antonio Stars. She is currently a free agent after being waived by the Las Vegas Aces on August 8, 2020.

Liberty  statistics
Source

USA Basketball
Born in Washington D.C., Warley was selected to represent the USA at the 2011 Pan American Games held in Guadalajara, Mexico. The USA team lost their first two games in close contests, losing to Argentina 58–55 and Puerto Rico 75–70. The team rebounded to win their games against Mexico and Jamaica, but the 2–2 overall record left them in seventh place. Warley averaged 2.5 points per game.

References

External links
 Liberty Lady Flames bio

1987 births
Living people
American women's basketball players
Atlanta Dream players
Basketball players at the 2011 Pan American Games
Basketball players from Washington, D.C.
Centers (basketball)
Chicago Sky players
Las Vegas Aces players
Liberty Lady Flames basketball players
New York Liberty players
Pan American Games competitors for the United States
Phoenix Mercury players
San Antonio Stars players
Undrafted Women's National Basketball Association players